Cordelia is a rural locality in the Shire of Hinchinbrook, Queensland, Australia.

Geography 
Cordelia has the following mountains:

 Mount Catherina 
 Mount Cordelia

History 
Cordelia Provisional School opened circa 1891 and closed circa 1893.

Cordelia State School opened on 13 April 1918 and closed on 15 March 1993. The school was at 15 Cordelia School Road.

References 

Shire of Hinchinbrook
Localities in Queensland